Sidney Franklin may refer to:

 Sidney Franklin (bullfighter) (1903–1976), American bullfighter
 Sidney Franklin (director) (1893–1972), American film director and producer
 Sidney Franklin (actor) (1870–1931), American stage and screen actor